New York's 96th State Assembly district is one of the 150 districts in the New York State Assembly. It has been represented by Kenneth Zebrowski Jr. since 2007. He succeeded his father Kenneth Zebrowski, who died the same year.

Geography
District 96 is located within Rockland County.

2020s
It consists of the towns of Clarkstown and portions of the towns of Haverstraw and Orangetown.

2010s
It consists of the towns of Clarkstown and Haverstraw and portions of Ramapo, including the villages of Pomona, Wesley Hills, and most of New Hempstead.

Recent election results

2022

2020

2018

2016

2014

2012

References 

96
Rockland County, New York